The Craggy Mountain Line is a non-profit, all volunteer run, railroad museum located in, Asheville, North Carolina. Craggy Mountain Line operates from May through the end of September. The collection includes local historic cars from Ashville in addition to transit cars from Chicago and New York City.

References

External Links
 

Railroad museums in North Carolina
Museums in Asheville, North Carolina